The 2016 German Open Grand Prix Gold was the fourth Grand Prix's badminton tournament of the 2016 BWF Grand Prix and Grand Prix Gold. It was the 59th edition of the German Open. The tournament was held at the RWE-Sporthalle in Mulheim an der Ruhr, Germany on 1–6 March 2016 and had a total purse of $120,000.

Men's singles

Seeds

  Jan Ø. Jørgensen (semifinals)
  Lin Dan (champion)
  Viktor Axelsen (first round)
  Chou Tien-chen (final)
  Tian Houwei (quarterfinals)
  Srikanth Kidambi (third round)
  Tommy Sugiarto (first round)
  Son Wan-ho (semifinals)
  Hu Yun (third round)
  Wei Nan (quarterfinals)
  Kashyap Parupalli (third round)
  Ng Ka Long (quarterfinals)
  Rajiv Ouseph (withdrawn)
  Marc Zwiebler (second round)
  Lee Dong-keun (third round)
  Sho Sasaki (quarterfinals)

Finals

Top half

Section 1

Section 2

Section 3

Section 4

Bottom half

Section 5

Section 6

Section 7

Section 8

Women's singles

Seeds

  Carolina Marín (withdrawn)
  Li Xuerui (champion)
  Sung Ji-hyun (quarterfinals)
  Wang Shixian (final)
  Nozomi Okuhara (semifinals)
  Akane Yamaguchi (semifinals)
  P. V. Sindhu (quarterfinals)
  Sayaka Sato (first round)

Finals

Top half

Section 1

Section 2

Bottom half

Section 3

Section 4

Men's doubles

Seeds

  Lee Yong-dae / Yoo Yeon-seong (final)
  Chai Biao / Hong Wei (second round)
  Hiroyuki Endo / Kenichi Hayakawa (semifinals)
  Kim Gi-jung / Kim Sa-rang (first round)
  Mads Conrad-Petersen / Mads Pieler Kolding (quarterfinals)
  Ko Sung-hyun / Shin Baek-cheol (champion)
  Liu Xiaolong / Qiu Zihan (quarterfinals)
  Vladimir Ivanov / Ivan Sozonov (semifinals)

Finals

Top half

Section 1

Section 2

Bottom half

Section 3

Section 4

Women's doubles

Seeds

  Nitya Krishinda Maheswari / Greysia Polii (semifinals)
  Misaki Matsutomo / Ayaka Takahashi (semifinals)
  Christinna Pedersen / Kamilla Rytter Juhl (withdrawn)
  Jung Kyung-eun / Shin Seung-chan (second round)
  Tang Yuanting / Yu Yang (withdrawn)
  Chang Ye-na / Lee So-hee (second round)
  Eefje Muskens / Selena Piek (first round)
  Naoko Fukuman / Kurumi Yonao (first round)

Finals

Top half

Section 1

Section 2

Bottom half

Section 3

Section 4

Mixed doubles

Seeds

  Ko Sung-hyun / Kim Ha-na (champion)
  Chris Adcock / Gabrielle Adcock (second round)
  Lu Kai / Huang Yaqiong (first round)
  Lee Chun Hei / Chau Hoi Wah (first round)
  Shin Baek-cheol / Chae Yoo-jung (final)
  Choi Sol-gyu / Eom Hye-won (semifinals)
  Chan Peng Soon / Goh Liu Ying (first round)
  Jacco Arends / Selena Piek (first round)

Finals

Top half

Section 1

Section 2

Bottom half

Section 3

Section 4

References

External links 
 Tournament Link

German Open (badminton)
BWF Grand Prix Gold and Grand Prix
German Open
German Open
Sport in Mülheim